Barkmere is a ville in the Canadian province of Quebec, located in Les Laurentides Regional County Municipality.

It is one of the smallest incorporated municipalities in Quebec, with a population of just 81 in the Canada 2021 Census.

Demographics 

Population trend:
 Population in 2021: 81 (2016 to 2021 population change: 39.7%)
 Population in 2016: 58 
 Population in 2011: 58 
 Population in 2006: 87
 Population in 2001: 44
 Population in 1996: 53
 Population in 1991: 62

Mother tongue:
 English as first language: 25%
 French as first language: 68.8%
 English and French as first language: 6.3%
 Other as first language: 0%

Gallery

Education

Sir Wilfrid Laurier School Board operates English-language schools:
 Arundel Elementary School in Arundel
 Sainte Agathe Academy (for high school only) in Sainte-Agathe-des-Monts

References

External links
 
 Ville de Barkmere

Cities and towns in Quebec
Incorporated places in Laurentides
Bilingual cities and towns in Quebec